Francis Preston Blair Sr. (April 12, 1791 – October 18, 1876) was an American journalist, newspaper editor, and influential figure in national politics advising several U.S. presidents across party lines.

Blair was an early member of the Democratic Party, and a strong supporter of President Andrew Jackson, having helped him win Kentucky in the 1828 presidential election. From 1831 to 1845, Blair worked as Editor-in-Chief of the Washington Globe, which served as the primary propaganda instrument for the Democratic Party, and was largely successful. Blair was an influential advisor to President Jackson, and served prominently in a group of unofficial advisors and assistants known as the "Kitchen Cabinet".

Blair, despite being a slaveholder from Kentucky, eventually came to oppose the expansion of slavery into western territories. He supported the Free Soil Party ticket of Martin Van Buren and Charles Francis Adams Sr. in the 1848 presidential election. In 1854, in opposition to the Kansas–Nebraska Act, he left the Democratic Party and helped establish the Republican Party. Blair served as an advisor to President Abraham Lincoln during the American Civil War. In 1861, he was sent by Lincoln to offer command of a large Union army to Colonel Robert E. Lee, who declined, and instead joined the Confederacy. Blair also helped organize the Hampton Roads Conference of 1865, a failed attempt to end the war.

After the Union victory, Blair became disillusioned with Radical Reconstruction, a policy promoted by many members of the Republican Party. He eventually left the party and rejoined the Democrats. His son, Francis Preston Blair Jr., was the party's nominee for vice president on a losing ticket in the 1868 election. Blair died in 1876 at age 85. 

His home, Blair House on Lafayette Square, Washington, D.C. across from the White House, is now used to host visiting heads of state and other guests of the president. It has been called "the world's most exclusive hotel."

Early life and career
Blair was born at Abingdon, Virginia to a Scottish-American named James Blair, a lawyer who became an Attorney General of Kentucky, and Elizabeth Smith. Raised in Frankfort, Kentucky and referred to as "Preston" by the family members, he graduated from Transylvania University with honors in 1811. He studied law, was admitted to the bar in 1817 but did not practice due to a vocal defect. He took to journalism, and became a contributor to Amos Kendall's paper, the Frankfort Argus.

During the social and financial turmoil caused by the Panic of 1819, Blair joined the so-called Relief Party of Kentucky. He participated in the Old Court – New Court controversy in Kentucky. He was president of the public Bank of the Commonwealth, which opened in May 1821 to provide relief for debtors. The Bank's charter was denied by the Kentucky Court of Appeals (KCoA), which was backed by the United States 7th Circuit Court of Appeals. The KCoA ruled that the relief measures already started were unconstitutional. The state legislature abolished the KCoA, and created a new Court of Appeals, but the Justices of the old KCoA refused to accept this act or turn over the Court's records. In 1824, Blair was appointed Clerk of the "New Court", and led a party which broke into the clerk's office and seized the records. A few years later, the New Court was abolished and Blair returned.

As an ardent follower of Andrew Jackson, he helped him to carry Kentucky in the 1828 presidential election. In 1830, he was made editor of The Washington Globe, the newspaper that was the recognized organ of the Jacksonian democracy. In this capacity, and as a member of Jackson's unofficial advisory council, the so-called "Kitchen Cabinet", he exerted a powerful influence on national politics. The Washington Globe was the administration's voice until 1841, and the chief Democratic organ until 1845, when Blair ceased to be its editor. He partnered with John C. Rives, and started a printing house, receiving profitable orders from Congress, including publishing the proceedings of Congress in The Congressional Globe, the precursor of the Congressional Record. During his time in Washington serving Jackson, Blair acquired in 1836 what later became known as the Blair House at Washington, D.C.

Politician

Blair backed James K. Polk during  the 1844 presidential election; however, he did not establish a good rapport with Polk and was forced to sell his interest in The Washington Globe. In 1848, he actively supported Martin Van Buren, the Free Soil candidate, for the presidency. Next, in 1852, Blair supported Franklin Pierce, but became disillusioned in his administration after Pierce backed the Kansas–Nebraska Act. With other anti-slavery, free-soil Democrats, Blair helped to organize the new Republican Party, and presided at its 1856 preliminary convention at Pittsburgh on February 22, 1856, forging a party block out of discordant elements of Whigs, abolitionists, free-soilers and nativists. He used his political experience, influence and persuasion to create a momentum for a new party.

At the 1856 Republican National Convention, he was influential in securing the nomination of John C. Frémont, who was married to Jessie Benton Frémont, a daughter of his old friend, Thomas Hart Benton, for the presidency. At the 1860 Republican convention, he, as delegate at large from Maryland, initially supported Edward Bates for the 1860 presidential nomination. When it became clear that Bates would not succeed, Blair supported the nomination of Abraham Lincoln.

The elder Blair took it upon himself to advise Lincoln, and both of his sons, Francis Jr., who became a Union general, and Montgomery Blair, who joined the Lincoln's cabinet, were president's trusted associates. On April 17, 1861, just three days after the surrender of Fort Sumter, Lincoln asked Francis Blair to convey his offer to Colonel Robert E. Lee to command the Union Army. The next day, Lee visited Blair across Lafayette Square from the White House. Lee blunted Blair's offer of the Union command by saying: "Mr. Blair, I look upon secession as anarchy. If I owned the four millions of slaves at the South, I would sacrifice them all to the Union; but how can I draw my sword upon Virginia, my native State?"

After Lincoln's re-election in 1864, Blair thought that his former close personal relations with the Confederate leaders, including President Jefferson Davis, might aid in bringing about a cessation of hostilities, and with Lincoln's consent went unofficially two times to Richmond and induced President Davis to appoint commissioners including Confederate Vice President Alexander H. Stephens to confer with representatives of the United States. This political maneuvering resulted in the futile Hampton Roads Conference of February 3, 1865.

During the Reconstruction Era, Blair advocated a speedy reunification without placing much burden on the Southern states and spoke against the Radical Republicans' Reconstruction policies in the South. He became a political ally of President Andrew Johnson, and eventually rejoined the Democratic Party.

Later years

Preston Blair permanently established his residence in Washington, D.C. in 1836 after acquiring a home on 1651 Pennsylvania Avenue Northwest. The brick dwelling first became known as Blair's House and then simply Blair House. In 1840, Blair, and perhaps his daughter Elizabeth, encountered a "mica-flecked" spring in the vicinity of Seventh Street Pike, now Acorn Park on Blair Mill Rd. off the renamed Georgia Avenue in Montgomery County, Maryland. He liked the location at present day East West Highway and Newell Street, Silver Spring, Maryland, so much that he bought the surrounding land and built a spacious summer home in 1849 which he called The Silver Spring. His son James, a naval officer, and his wife Mary lived in a two-story cottage on the estate, eventually naming it The Moorings. Blair's other son, Montgomery, built a summer house for his family nearby, calling it Falkland; it was burned down in 1864 during a Confederate raid by General Jubal Early. Gen. Early denied any personal involvement with the destruction of Falkland  and took credit for saving The Crystal Spring from plunder.

In 1854, Blair gave his Washington, D.C. house to his son Montgomery and permanently settled at The Silver Spring. After his death, his daughter Elisabeth inherited the house for her lifetime.

Even though he held slaves as servants in his household, Blair became convinced after the Mexican–American War that slavery should not be extended beyond where it was currently allowed. By 1862, Blair had told his slaves that they could "go when they wished"; he later said that "all but one declined the privilege," choosing to stay on as servants.

After the Civil War, Blair placed all his political hopes and aspirations with his son, Francis "Frank" Blair, who was the 1868 Democratic vice-presidential candidate and became a U.S. Senator in 1871 before dying in 1875. Blair died the following year at his estate at Silver Spring, Maryland, at the age of 85.

Family

Francis married Eliza Violet Gist on July 21, 1812. He had three sons, Montgomery Blair (1813–1883), James L. Blair (1819–1852) and Francis "Frank" Preston Blair Jr. (1821–1875), and two daughters, Juliet Blair (1816–1819) and Elizabeth Blair (1818–1906). Montgomery and Francis became prominent in American politics. Among many contributions, Montgomery Blair represented Dred Scott before the United States Supreme Court in the seminal 1857 case regarding slavery. Francis became a prominent Senator and ran as the Democratic Party's nominee for the Vice Presidency in 1868. James, who participated as a midshipman in Antarctica's exploration and was later commissioned as a lieutenant in the U.S. Navy, made his fortune during the California Gold Rush, but died at an early age. Blair's daughter, Elizabeth married Rear Admiral Samuel Phillips Lee and was a close friend of Mary Todd Lincoln. His nephew, Benjamin Gratz Brown (1826–1885) was also politically inclined, becoming a U.S. Senator and Missouri Governor. His grandson, Blair Lee I (1857–1944) became a U.S. Senator from Maryland.

Legacy
As editor of The Washington Globe newspaper for fifteen years and publisher of The Congressional Globe, Preston Blair became an influential political figure of the Jacksonian Era, and served as an unofficial adviser to presidents Andrew Jackson and Martin Van Buren. By idealizing republicanism and democracy as national ideals in his writing, he contributed to the growing popular spirit of Americanism. Blair held onto his political capital during Van Buren's presidency, but began losing his political influence as the pro-slavery wing of the Democratic Party gained more power.

In response, after briefly supporting the Free Soil party, he helped to launch the new Republican party in 1854. At the outbreak of the Civil War, he personally conveyed Lincoln's offer to Robert E. Lee to command all the Union armies, which Lee rejected. During the war, Blair served as unofficial political adviser to Lincoln.  After Lincoln's re-election, Blair organized the abortive Hampton Roads Conference, where peace terms were discussed with the Confederates, but no substantial issues resolved. He opposed the radical congressional Reconstruction of the South after the Civil War.

William Ernest Smith, Professor of American History from Miami University, wrote in 1933 that Francis Preston Blair and his two sons, Francis and Montgomery, "are representatives of a longer period of influence in American politics than any other family except the Adams family." Two of Blair's three sons, Montgomery Blair and Francis Preston Blair Jr. were prominent in American politics; his daughter, Elizabeth Blair Lee, was Mary Todd Lincoln's confidante. Blair's Washington, D.C., residence with its rich history withstood the test of time and currently Blair House is the common name of the President's Guest House complex.

The city of Silver Spring, Maryland took its name from Blair's estate. Out of three houses connected to the Blairs at Silver Spring, only the house of James Blair survived. In her will, Violet Blair Janin, a daughter of James and Mary Blair, designated the house for public use and renamed it from The Moorings to Jesup Blair House in honor of her brother. It is currently located in the center of 14.5-acre Blair Park at Silver Spring and is administered by the Maryland-National Capital Park and Planning Commission.

In 1885, a new school at 635 I Street, NE in Washington D.C. was renamed the "Blair School" in honor of Francis P. Blair Sr. The school was closed prior to 1978 when the building became the home of Blair House, a large Transitional Rehabilitation housing facility.

Media portrayal
 In Steven Spielberg's Lincoln (2012), Preston Blair is played by Hal Holbrook.
 In Ronald Maxwell's Gods and Generals (2003), Preston Blair is played by Malachy McCourt.

Neither Spielberg's nor Maxwell's production teams elected to actually portray Francis Preston Blair particularly faithfully. Whereas in real life, he was of a spindly frame, bald, and clean-shaven, both films portray him as overweight, and while Lincoln portray him as having a great mop of hair by the standards of the time, Gods and Generals portray him as having a handlebar moustache. This is highly curious, seeing both movies otherwise went out of their ways to secure as aesthetically a realistic depiction of the era and the people therein as possible.

See also
Old Court – New Court controversy

References

Attribution:

Further reading
 Blair, Francis P. A Voice from the Grave of Jackson: Letter from Francis P. Blair to a Public Meeting in New York, Held April 29, 1856. Washington: Buell & Blanchard, printers, 1856.
 The Papers of the Blair Family. Washington, D.C.: Library of Congress, 1988.  
 Laas, Virginia J. Wartime Washington: The Civil War Letters of Elizabeth Blair Lee. Urbana: University of Illinois Press, 1991. 
 Smith, Elbert B. Francis Preston Blair. New York: Free Press, 1980.
 Smith, William E. Francis P. Blair: Pen-executive of Andrew Jackson. Cedar Rapids: The Torch Press, 1931.
 Smith, William E. The Francis Preston Blair Family in Politics, 2 vols. New York: The Macmillan Company, 1933.

External links

 
 Blair House
 Blair family papers from Princeton University Library. Special Collections

1791 births
1876 deaths
Transylvania University alumni
19th-century American newspaper editors
United States presidential advisors
People of Kentucky in the American Civil War
People from Abingdon, Virginia
Washington, D.C., Republicans
Washington, D.C., Democrats
Journalists from Virginia
Blair family
People from Silver Spring, Maryland